The Worldcruiser 44 is an American sailboat that was designed by Bud Taplin as a cruiser and first built in 1980.

Production
The design was built by the Worldcruiser Yacht Company in the United States. The company commenced production in 1980 and completed three boats, but it is now out of production.

Design
The Worldcruiser 44 is a recreational keelboat, built predominantly of fiberglass, with wood trim. It has a two-masted schooner rig, with painted aluminum spars, a spooned raked stem with a bowsprit, a raised counter transom with a boomkin, a skeg-mounted rudder controlled by a wheel and a fixed modified long keel, with a cutaway forefoot. It displaces  and carries  of lead ballast.

The design has sleeping accommodation for five people, with a double berth forward, an "L"-shaped settee and table in the main cabin and an aft cabin with a double berth on the port side. The galley is located on the port side at the foot of the companionway ladder. The galley is "U"-shaped and is equipped with a three-burner stove, an oven and a double sink. Two desks with chart stowage and bookcases provide navigation station space on the starboard side, aft of the companionway. The head is located forward of the front berth and includes a shower and pressurized water. The forepeak has separate sail and chain lockers.

Ventilation is provided by four opening hatches, plus bronze ports.

For sailing the design is equipped with booms on all sails, save the forward jib. All booms have sheet travelers. The boat can mount a large genoa and gollywobbler, which is a large staysail mounted in between the two masts.

Operational history
In a 1994 review Richard Sherwood wrote, "Worldcruiser feels that the sails on a boat over 40 feet should be small enough to handle without a large crew and that two-masted rigs are the answer. In light weather, flying a genoa instead of the headsails, and with a gollywobbler in place of the foresail and fisherman, the boat has a total sail area of over 2,000 square feet."

See also
List of sailing boat types

Similar sailboats
Alden 44
Nauticat 44

References

Keelboats
1980s sailboat type designs
Sailing yachts
Sailboat type designs by Bud Taplin
Sailboat types built by Worldcruiser Yacht Company